Liueli Fusimalohi (born c. 1966) is a Tongan former rugby union player and coach. He played as fullback.

Career
Despite being member of the 1987 Rugby World Cup squad, Fusimalohi did not play any match of in the tournament, due to Tali Ete'aki being the first-choice fullback for Tonga in the tournament. He began his international career with Tonga on 29 August 1987, against Fiji in Suva. His last international cap was against Fiji, in Suva, on 11 June 1991. He earned 5 matches, 0 points and 0 conversions in aggregate.

Coaching career
Between 2000 and 2001, he served as assistant coach for Tonga under the tenure of the then-head coach Valita Ueleni.
Since 2015, Fusimalohi coaches the Tonga national under-20 rugby union team.

References

External links

1966 births
Living people
Tongan rugby union coaches
Tongan rugby union players
Rugby union fullbacks
Tonga international rugby union players